Tallinna Teataja was newspaper published 1910–1922 in Tallinn, Estonia.

Publishers were:
M. Schiffer (1910-1911 nr. 97)
A. Kampf (1911 nr. 98-184)
H. Ant ja J. Masing (1916 nr. 261 - 1917) 
Ed. Sarepera (1918 nr. 1-62).

References

Newspapers published in Estonia
Mass media in Tallinn